Schulten is a surname. It may refer to:

Adolf Schulten (1870–1960), German historian and archaeologist
Alcuin Schulten (born 1972), Dutch figure skater
John William Schulten (1821–1875), also spelled Johann Wilhelm, 19th-century chess master from Germany and the United States
Klaus Schulten (1947–2016), German-American computational biophysicist and Professor of Physics 
Rudolf Schulten (1923–1996), university professor and main developer of the pebble bed reactor design
Susan Schulten, American historian and professor 
Ton Schulten (born 1938), Dutch painter

See also